Fatos Bećiraj (born 5 May 1988) is a Montenegrin professional footballer who plays as a striker for FK Mornar and the Montenegro national team.

Club career

Early career and Budućnost
Bećiraj began his career in his hometown of Peja with the local club Shqiponja at 17 years of age, before joining their city rivals Besa Pejë in July 2007. After spending the first half of the 2007–08 season with Besa Pejë, his good performances in the Kosovar Superliga attracted attention from several clubs in the region, and in January 2008, Bećiraj moved to the Montenegrin First League side Budućnost Podgorica.

He immediately established himself as a first team regular at Budućnost, scoring 9 goals in 15 appearances in the second half of the 2007–08 season, helping the club win the Montenegrin championship title and finish runners-up in the 2007–08 Montenegrin Cup. In the following two seasons, Bećiraj scored 28 league goals in 62 matches for the club, becoming league top scorer in the 2008–09 season with 18 goals scored.

Dinamo Zagreb
On 30 August 2010, it was announced that Bećiraj signed for Croatian club Dinamo Zagreb. He played well in his debut season with Dinamo and became regularly called up to the Montenegro national team. He played in 22 league matches and scored 8 goals, most notably a beautiful goal against Rijeka and a fine header against Hajduk Split.

Bećiraj struggled to find his goalscoring form at the beginning of the 2011–12 season, finally scoring after eight matches without a goal, netting the fifth goal in a 5–0 win against Karlovac. He then scored the last goal in a 4–1 win against Malmö in the 2011–12 UEFA Champions League Play-off. Bećiraj then continued his goalscoring form in domestic competition, scoring against Varaždin, Istra 1961, Zadar, Šibenik and Split.

On 22 November 2011, Bećiraj scored Dinamo's first goal in the 2011–12 UEFA Champions League, netting a header in the club's 6–2 away loss to Real Madrid at the Santiago Bernabéu.

Bećiraj was the first choice striker throughout the 2011–12 season and became top scorer of the Prva HNL with 15 goals in 28 appearances, becoming the first foreign player to accomplish that feat.

Changchun Yatai
In February 2014, Bećiraj transferred to Chinese Super League side Changchun Yatai. On 8 March 2014, he made his debut for Yatai in a 1-0 away defeat against Beijing Guoan. On 23 April 2014, he scored his first goal for the club in a 3-1 away win against defending champions Guangzhou Evergrande. He made 28 appearances for Yatai in the 2014 season and scored 7 goals.

Dinamo Minsk
In January 2015, Bećiraj transferred to Belarusian Premier League side Dinamo Minsk. On 6 August 2015, he scored a 118th-minute winner in a 1–1 extra-time (2–1 aggregate) win over Swiss side Zürich in the second leg of the 2015–16 UEFA Europa League third qualifying round.

Dynamo Moscow
On 18 February 2016, Bećiraj signed a 3.5-year contract with Russian side Dynamo Moscow. He scored his first goal for Dynamo Moscow on 19 March 2016, giving his club a 1–0 win against Ufa. On 11 January 2018, Bećiraj's Dynamo contract was dissolved by mutual consent, making him a free agent.

Mechelen
The day after leaving Dynamo Moscow, on 12 January 2018, Bećiraj signed a contract with the Belgian First Division A club Mechelen.

Maccabi Netanya
On 5 September 2018, Bećiraj signed with Israeli Premier League side Maccabi Netanya. He was the top goalscorer for the club in his debut season scoring 15 goals in all club competitions. His second season with Netanya wasn't as successful, scoring only 7 times in the league and once in the Toto Cup. On 7 June 2020, Bećiraj requested to be released from the club. In the two seasons with the club, he scored a total of 23 goals in 63 appearances for the club.

Wisła Kraków
On July 25, 2020 Bećiraj signed with Polish side Wisła Kraków on a two-year contract after leaving Maccabi Netanya by contract termination.

Bnei Yehuda
On February 11, 2021 Bećiraj signed for Bnei Yehuda of the Israeli Premier League.

International career

Bećiraj was first called up for the Montenegro U21 national team by head coach Dušan Vlaisavljević in 2009, winning his first cap in a 2011 European Under-21 Championship qualifier against Kazakhstan on 7 June 2009. He went on to earn five caps for the U21 team before receiving his first call-up for the senior team in March 2009, for a 2010 FIFA World Cup qualifier against Italy. Bećiraj made his international debut in that match, coming on as a substitute for Radomir Đalović in the 70th minute of the game. He scored his first goal for Montenegro on 17 November 2010 in a friendly match against Azerbaijan. On 7 June 2019, Bećiraj captained Montenegro in a 1–1 draw against his country of birth of Kosovo. In November 2022, Bećiraj announced the end of his national team career, after 86 appearances and 15 scored goals.

Career statistics

Club

International

International goals
Scores and results list Montenegro's goal tally first.

Honours
Budućnost Podgorica
Montenegrin First League: 2007–08

Dinamo Zagreb
1. HNL: 2010–11, 2011–12, 2012–13
Croatian Cup: 2010–11, 2011–12
Croatian Super Cup: 2013

Dynamo Moscow
Russian Football National League: 2016–17

Individual
Performance
Montenegrin First League top goalscorer: 2008–09 (18 goals)
1. HNL top goalscorer: 2011–12 (15 goals)

References

External links

 
 
Fatos Bećiraj profile at FC Dynamo Moscow
Fatos Bećiraj profile at the Football Association of Montenegro

1988 births
Living people
Sportspeople from Peja
Kosovo Albanians
Albanians in Montenegro
Montenegrin people of Kosovan descent
Association football forwards
Montenegrin footballers
Montenegro under-21 international footballers
Montenegro international footballers
KF Besa players
FK Budućnost Podgorica players
GNK Dinamo Zagreb players
Changchun Yatai F.C. players
FC Dinamo Minsk players
FC Dynamo Moscow players
K.V. Mechelen players
Maccabi Netanya F.C. players
Wisła Kraków players
Bnei Yehuda Tel Aviv F.C. players
FC Astana players
FK Dečić players
Football Superleague of Kosovo players
Montenegrin First League players
Croatian Football League players
Chinese Super League players
Belarusian Premier League players
Russian Premier League players
Russian First League players
Belgian Pro League players
Israeli Premier League players
Ekstraklasa players
Kazakhstan Premier League players
Montenegrin expatriate footballers
Expatriate footballers in Croatia
Expatriate footballers in China
Expatriate footballers in Belarus
Expatriate footballers in Russia
Expatriate footballers in Belgium
Expatriate footballers in Israel
Expatriate footballers in Poland
Expatriate footballers in Kazakhstan
Montenegrin expatriate sportspeople in Croatia
Montenegrin expatriate sportspeople in China
Montenegrin expatriate sportspeople in Belarus
Montenegrin expatriate sportspeople in Russia
Montenegrin expatriate sportspeople in Belgium
Montenegrin expatriate sportspeople in Israel
Montenegrin expatriate sportspeople in Poland
Montenegrin expatriate sportspeople in Kazakhstan